Errington is a surname found in the English-speaking world.

Notable people with this name
Elizabeth Errington, British archaeologist and numismatist
Sir Eric Errington, 1st Baronet (1900–1973), a British barrister and Conservative Party politician
Frank R. Errington (1890–1958), a British diver who competed in the 1908 Summer Olympics
 George Errington (bishop) (1804–1886), Roman Catholic churchman, Bishop of Plymouth 1851–55, Coadjutor Archbishop of Westminster 1855–60
 George Errington (martyr) (died 1596), English Roman Catholic martyr, hanged, drawn and quartered at York, beatified 1987
 Sir George Errington, 1st Baronet (1839–1920), Irish politician, MP for Longford 1874–85
 Grant Errington OAM, Australian Educator (born 1958), Developed the introduction of Vocational Education and Training in NSW High Schools 2008
Harry Errington (1910–2004), the only London firefighter to be awarded the George Cross during the Second World War
John Edward Errington (1806–1862), an English civil engineer
John Errington Moss (born 1940), a Canadian novelist
Lancelot Errington, an 18th-century Northumbrian noted for his capture of Lindisfarne during the Jacobite Rising of 1715
Nicolas Errington (died 1593), English soldier
Shelly E. Errington, a cultural anthropologist specializing in the studies of plastic art and narrative arts
Sue E. Errington, a Democratic member of the Indiana Senate, representing the 26th District since 2006
William Errington (1699–1739), High Sheriff of Northumberland
William Errington (1716–1768), an English Roman Catholic priest, the founder of Sedgley Park School
Mark Errington Brydon (born 1960), an English musician best known as a member of the group Moloko
Heavy D (Dwight Errington Myers, 1967–2011), a Jamaican American rapper, singer and leader of Heavy D & the Boyz 
Errington Ridley Liddell Keen (1910–1984), also known as Eric Keen, an English football player and manager 
John Miles (born John Errington, 1949), an English musician best known for his 1976 hit "Music (Was my First Love)"
Spragga Benz (born Carlton Errington Grant 1969), a Jamaican Dancehall Deejay
 Charles Huton Errington, noteworthy 19th Century English Watchmaker based in Coventry

See also
The Errington baronets, three baronetcies of England or the United Kingdom
Errington (disambiguation)

References

Surnames
English-language surnames
Surnames of English origin
Surnames of British Isles origin
Surnames of Scottish origin